Bernat II de Cabrera (Spanish: Bernardo II de Cabrera. 1298–1364) was an Aragonese nobleman, diplomat, and military commander.  Born in Calatayud, he participated in the conquest of Majorca (1343). He commanded the naval squadron that defeated the Genoese navy and took Alghero in 1353.

As the ambassador of Peter IV of Aragon, he negotiated the Peace of Deza between Castile and Aragon on May 18, 1361 during the War of the Two Peters.

The war, however, later continued, and when Cabrera refused to further support Peter's allies Henry of Trastámara and Charles the Bad of Navarre against Pedro of Castile, Cabrera fell into disfavor at court and was executed as a traitor at Zaragoza.

References

External links 
 Bernardo de Cabrera 

1298 births
1364 deaths
People from Comunidad de Calatayud
Crown of Aragon